Savyolovskaya is a station on the Bolshaya Koltsevaya line of the Moscow Metro. It opened on 30 December 2018. Until December 2020, this station also served as the terminus of Solntsevskaya line.

During planning and construction, this station was named "Nizhnyaya Maslovka" for the street on which it is located.  Before opening, the metro changed the name to be consistent with the other connected stations.

History
Construction on the station began in 2012. At first, the city intended to use typical underground tunneling methods for the station, which is 65 meters (213 feet) underground. Project engineers suggested a new technology that would involve a single-vaulted design that is more commonly used for shallow stations constructed using cut-and-cover methods. This could reduce the construction time from 36 to 24 months.  The city originally expected the station to be ready by 2016. This later was pushed to 2017 and, eventually, the beginning of 2019. Because of the time and difficulty of building such deep stations, the Head of Construction for Moscow Marat Khusnullin said that this would be the last deep station built in Moscow.

Location 
It is in the near Nizhnyaya Maslovka and Butyrsky Val streets in the Maryina roshcha District of Moscow near the Moscow Savyolovsky railway station.  There is a free interchange to Savyolovskaya station on the Serpukhovsko-Timiryazevskaya line, which provides access to central Moscow. It also serves the nearby Savyolovsky railway station. Passengers are able to access the station through two underground lobbies.

Design
The walls of the station are not covered in panels or concrete; rather, they are covered in glass such that passengers can see the structure of the tunnels.

Otherwise, the platforms and vestibules have marble and granite floors and walls.

References

Moscow Metro stations
Bolshaya Koltsevaya line
Railway stations in Russia opened in 2018
Railway stations located underground in Russia